Bhuvan Shome is a 1969 Indian Hindi-language drama film directed by Mrinal Sen based on the story of Balai Chand Mukhopadhyay. The cast includes Utpal Dutt (Mr. Bhuvan Shome) and Suhasini Mulay (Gauri, a village belle). Sen based his film on a Bengali story by Balai Chand Mukhopadhyay. The film is considered a landmark in modern Indian cinema.

This was the debut film of Suhasini Mulay. Amitabh Bachchan did the voiceover and was the narrator.

Plot

Bhuvan Shome, a widower and a dedicated civil servant - strict, uncompromising - is a "big officer" in the Indian Railways. The background of the film is constructed in the context of a few railway ticket checkers discussing him as a strict, unreasonable officer ("afsar"). It continues with him being described, by the narrator, as a man whose "Bengali"-ness has not been affected by his travels. His apparent age, late 50s, is an important element of his psychology.

Inspired by the idea of hunting, Bhuvan Shome takes a "hunting holiday" to Gujarat. It is quite clear that his expedition is amateurish. He is portrayed as an inept "hunter" rather than a man who knows how to acquire a skill.

His encounter with the young Gouri is fortuitous because it is she who takes care of him and helps "hunt" birds. She helps him through a barren wilderness, takes him home and takes care of him. When he is made to change his clothes because otherwise the "birds will know" and fly away is probably an important part of his transformation from a strict, conformist and aging man to one of a person more open to the stimuli of his environment.

The subsequent hunting sojourn of Gouri and Bhuvan Shome is a lyrical exploration of Bhuvan Shome's transformation. He is not only enamored by the simple beauty of Gouri, but also enchanted by the sights of birds on the lake and in the sky.

His hunt is "successful," but only in a way that reflects Bhuvan Shome's limitations as a man.

Bhuvan Shome is deeply affected by Gouri, who is actually schooled more than he could expect to be in that environment.

When he returns to his office chambers, he is seen to reprieve an offending railwayman. This is a sub-plot that completes the story and context of the initial narration.

Cast 
  Amitabh Bachchan
 Utpal Dutt as Bhuvan Shome
 Suhasini Mulay as Gauri
 Shekhar Chatterjee
 Sadhu Meher
 Punya Das
 Rochak Pandit

Themes

Bhuvan Shome is said to have pioneered the Indian New Wave. It was one of the earliest films to get funded by the National Film Development Corporation of India. The film deals with  themes of monotony, solitude, camaraderie, and compassion. It also highlights the rural-urban divide in India.

Awards
National Film Awards
 Best Feature Film
 Best Director - Mrinal Sen
 Best Actor - Utpal Dutt

4th International Film Festival of India
Jury Prize for Mrinal Sen

References

External links

 

1969 films
1960s Hindi-language films
Indian avant-garde and experimental films
Films directed by Mrinal Sen
Films featuring a Best Actor National Award-winning performance
Films whose director won the Best Director National Film Award
Best Feature Film National Film Award winners
Films based on works by Balai Chand Mukhopadhyay